Edwin Hughes may refer to:

 Edwin Hughes (footballer) (1885-1949), Welsh footballer
 Edwin Hughes (politician) (1832–1904), English solicitor and Conservative politician 
 Edwin Hughes (musician) (1884–1965), American pianist, teacher, music editor, and composer
 Edwin Hughes (soldier) (1830–1927), last survivor of the Charge of the Light Brigade
 Edwin Holt Hughes (1866–1950), American bishop of the Methodist Episcopal Church

See also  
 Hughes (surname)